Karla Beatriz Ortiz Oyola (born October 20, 1991 in Lima, Peru) is a Peruvian volleyball player who plays as Outside Hitter for the Peru national team. Playing volleyball, Ortiz has represented her country at the 2013 Bolivarian Games, the 2011 Pan American Games and the 2010 FIVB World Championship in Japan.

Ortiz played with Boston College in the 2012 season. She played with Haifa VC for the 2014-2015 Israeli League season, finishing as the Best Scorer and Best Spiker.

Clubs
  Divino Maestro (2007-2010)
  Hapoël Névé Shaanan (2011-2012)
  Boston College (2012)
  Sporting Cristal (2012–2014)
  Haifa VC (2014-2015)
  Sporting Cristal (2014–2016)
  Regatas Lima (2017–2021)

Awards

Individuals
 2013 South American Championship "Best Outside Hitter"
 2014-15 Israeli League "Best Scorer"
 2014-15 Israeli League "Best Spiker"

National Team
 2010 Pan-American Cup -  Silver Medal
 2009 South American Championship -  Bronze Medal
 2011 South American Championship -  Bronze Medal
 2013 South American Championship -  Bronze Medal
 2013 Bolivarian Games -  Gold Medal

Clubs
 2010-11 Liga Nacional Superior de Voleibol Femenino -  Champion, with Divino Maestro
 2011-12 Israeli Volleyball League -   Bronze medal, with Hapoël Névé Shaanan
 2012 Chilean League -  Champion, with Boston College
 2013 South American Club Championship -  Bronze medal, with Boston College
 2013 Chilean League -   Bronze medal, with Boston College
 2012-13 Liga Nacional Superior de Voleibol Femenino -   Bronze medal, with Sporting Cristal
 2013-14 Liga Nacional Superior de Voleibol Femenino -  Runner-Up, with Sporting Cristal

References

External links
 FIVB Profile

1991 births
Living people
Sportspeople from Lima
Peruvian women's volleyball players
21st-century Peruvian women